Akok is one of the famous traditional food in Kelantan and Terengganu, Malaysia. It can be eaten as snack or as a dessert. 

It is made with flour, sugar, eggs, and coconut milk.

Akok has two main variants. The first variant is made of flour, sugar, eggs and coconut milk. This variant normally can be seen in Terengganu. Another variant is made of flour, brown sugar or palm sugar, which will darken the akok's colour. This variant normally can be found in Kelantan and appear to be less fluffy compare to the first variant.

Akok also can comes in many shapes and the most common one with the shape like bahulu.

Akok best cook with traditional stove with charcoal, so that it will give a smoky aroma.

See also

 Cuisine of Malaysia

References

Malay cuisine
Snack foods